Anna Thilda May "May" Swenson (May 28, 1913 – December 4, 1989) was an American poet and playwright. Harold Bloom considered her one of the most important and original poets of the 20th century.

The first child of Margaret and Dan Arthur Swenson, she grew up as the eldest of 10 children in a Mormon household where Swedish was spoken regularly and English was a second language. Although her conservative family struggled to accept the fact that she was a lesbian, they remained close throughout her life. Much of her later poetry works were devoted to children (e.g. the collection Iconographs, 1970).  She also translated the work of contemporary Swedish poets, including the selected poems of Nobel laureate Tomas Tranströmer.

Personal life 

Swenson attended Utah State University in Logan, Utah, graduating in the class of 1934 with a bachelor's degree. She taught poetry as poet-in-residence at Bryn Mawr College, the University of North Carolina at Greensboro, the University of California, Riverside, Purdue University, and Utah State University. From 1959 to 1966 she worked as a manuscript reviewer at New Directions Publishing. Swenson left New Directions Press in 1966 in an effort to focus completely on her own writing. She also served as a Chancellor of the Academy of American Poets from 1980 until her death in 1989. She is buried in the Logan City Cemetery, and her grave is marked by a granite bench on which is etched some of her poetry. For the last twenty years of her life, she lived in Sea Cliff, New York.

In 1936, Swenson worked as an editor and ghostwriter for a man called "Plat", who became her "boyfriend." "I think I should like to have a son by Plat", she wrote in her diary, "but I would not like to be married to any man, but only be myself."

Her poems were published in Antaeus, The Atlantic Monthly, Carleton Miscellany, The Nation, The New Yorker, The Paris Review, Saturday Review, Parnassus and Poetry. Her poem Question was also published in Stephenie Meyer's book The Host.

Awards and recognition

She received much recognition for her work. Some of which include:
American Introductions Prize in 1955; 
William Rose Benet Prize of the Poetry Society of America in 1959; 
Longview Foundation Award in 1959; 
National Institute of Arts and Letters Award in 1960; 
Brandeis University Creative Arts Award in 1967; 
Lucy Martin Donnelly Award of Bryn Mawr College in 1968; 
Shelley Poetry Award in 1968
Guggenheim fellowship in 1959, 
Amy Lowell Traveling Scholarship in 1960, 
Ford Foundation grant in 1964 
Bollingen Prize for poetry in 1981, 
MacArthur Fellowship in 1987.

Style, imagery and eroticism
Swenson created poems in "iconograph" style, first published in her 1970 book Iconographs, in which Swenson shaped lines of her poetry to create images relating to the poem's content.  Her work "The Lowering", for instance, a memorial poem for Robert F. Kennedy, explored the late Kennedy's military funeral, with lines arranged in the shape of a folded flag. Swenson is known for her heavy use of natural imagery, mixed with religious and philosophical themes. Her poem "By Morning", which was published in The New Yorker compares a snowfall to the biblical fall of manna. 
Swenson's sense of imagery also lends itself to erotic poems, as she describes human bodies, breasts and limbs and the "pelvic heave of mountains." Author Jean Gould describes Swenson's work as "sensual as well as sexual."

Legacy

Washington University in St. Louis houses most of Swenson's documents and original manuscripts. This is the primary location for all scholarly materials on Swenson.

Utah State University also has two collections of her work, and an addendum in their Special Collections and Archives. The University has created the "May Swenson Project." Supported by students and teachers, it has publicized Swenson's work at USU, as well as her influence across the nation. In her name, USU has dedicated a May Swenson room in the English Department and another in the USU Merrill-Cazier Library. Funds are being sought to establish an endowed chair in Swenson's name.

The May Swenson Poetry Award, sponsored by Utah State University Press, is a competitive prize granted annually to an outstanding collection of poetry in English. Open to published and unpublished writers, with no limitation on subject, the competition honors May Swenson as one of America's most vital and provocative poets of the twentieth century. Judges for the competition have included Mary Oliver, Maxine Kumin, John Hollander, Mark Doty, Alice Quinn, Harold Bloom, Garrison Keillor, Edward Field and others from the first tier of American letters.

Digitized selected works by and about Swenson: May Swenson Addendum (Selected items)

Bibliography

Poetry 

Another Animal (Scribner, 1954); 
A Cage of Spines (Rinehart, 1958); 
To Mix with Time: New and Selected Poems (Scribner, 1963); 
Poems to Solve (for children "14-up") (Scribner, 1966); 
Half Sun Half Sleep (Scribner, 1967); 
Iconographs (Scribner, 1970); 
More Poems to Solve (Scribner, 1971);
New & Selected Things Taking Place (Little, Brown, 1978); 
In Other Words (Knopf, 1987);
Collected Poems (Library of America, 2013).

Prose 

Made With Words, ed. Gardner McFall (U of Mich Press, 1998).

Translations 

Windows and Stones: Selected Poems of Tomas Tranströmer (1972)

See also
 Lesbian Poetry

References

External links

Weber Spring 1991, Volume 8.1 (Poetry)
Swenson bio, Poets.org
The May Swenson Papers at Washington University in St. Louis
May Swenson Society
May Swenson materials in Robert A. Wilson collection from Special Collections, University of Delaware Library

1913 births
1989 deaths
American Latter Day Saints
American people of Swedish descent
American women poets
Latter Day Saint poets
American lesbian writers
LGBT Latter Day Saints
LGBT people from Utah
MacArthur Fellows
Poets from Utah
Utah State University alumni
Utah State University faculty
Bollingen Prize recipients
Writers from Logan, Utah
People from Sea Cliff, New York
20th-century American poets
20th-century American women writers
American women academics
20th-century American LGBT people
Members of the American Academy of Arts and Letters